Montserrat College of Art is a private, non-profit art college located in Beverly within Essex County of Massachusetts. The school is accredited by both the New England Commission of Higher Education and the National Association of Schools of Art and Design.

History

The school was established in 1970 as Montserrat School of Visual Arts and was founded by the North Shore Community Arts Foundation, a civic organization that managed the nearby North Shore Music Theatre. Joseph Jeswald, a local artist and former head of the Fine Arts Department at New England School of Art and Design, was chosen to serve as the first president of the school and Stephen Slane, one of the founders of the Arts Foundation along with C. Henry Glovsky and Ruby Newman, was named managing director. The school was accredited as a college and authorized to award a Bachelor of Fine Arts degree in the mid-1980s, at which time it changed to its name to the Montserrat College of Art. In 1992, the school moved to its present location on Essex Street in the Hardie Building, a renovated nineteenth-century school structure that serves as the campus center.

In early 2015, Montserrat College of Art explored a possible merger with Salem State University, a large public university in neighboring Salem. After some months of research and negotiations, the proposal was found to be not feasible and the plan was dropped in mid-2015.

For one year, William J. Bakrow served as interim president of Montserrat College of Art. In 2018, Kurt T. Steinberg was named the eighth president in school history.

Academics
Montserrat College of Art offers Bachelor of Fine Arts degrees in a number of fields including: Animation and Interactive Media; Art Education; Book Arts; Graphic Design; Interdisciplinary Arts; Illustration; Painting; Photo, Film, and Video; Printmaking; and Sculpture. A number of minors are offered including: Art Education; Art History; Creative Writing; Curatorial Studies, and Entrepreneurship in the Arts.

The school has study abroad programs for its students in Niigata, Japan, and in Mallorca, Spain. Additionally, the school offers continuing education courses and workshops in such subjects as painting and photography.

Campus
The Montserrat College of Art is located in downtown Beverly. The small campus includes the central Hardie Building on 23 Essex Street, a classroom, gallery, studio, and office space building on 248 Cabot Street, and apartment-style residence halls. In 2009, the Helena J. Sturnick Student Residence Village was opened. As of 2016, the college campus consists of a total of twelve academic and residential buildings.

The school is home to six public galleries, which are free to the public: the 301 Gallery; the Bare Gallery; the Carol Schlosberg Gallery; the Founders Gallery; the Montserrat Gallery; and the President's Office Gallery. The spaces exhibit a variety of works by international, national, regional, and local artists. Past exhibitions have featured artists such as Clint Baclawski, Hunter Cole, Jess T. Dugan, Sally Heller, Yun-Fei Ji, Valeri Larko, Derek Lerner, Vanessa Platacis, Cynthia von Buhler, Leigh Wiener, and David H. Wells.

The Paul M. Scott Library is part of the North of Boston Library Exchange consortium.

Notable faculty

Notable alumni

Carlos Dorrien (1974), sculptor
Jos Sances (1976), artist
Carol Schlosberg (1990), painter
Mary Pennington (Updike) Weatherall, painter
Montserrat College of Art has also awarded honorary degrees to the artists Edward Burtynsky, Tom Friedman, and Annette Lemieux, as well as the curators Anne Hawley and Robert Storr.

See also
List of art schools
List of colleges and universities in Massachusetts

References

External links
Official website

1970 establishments in Massachusetts
Educational institutions established in 1970
Art schools in Massachusetts
Private universities and colleges in Massachusetts
Universities and colleges in Beverly, Massachusetts